Malcolm Osborne   (1 August 1880 – 22 September 1963) was a British original printmaker known for his intaglio prints of landscapes, urban views and portraits.

Chronology
1 August 1880 born at Frome, Somerset, the fourth son of Alfred Arthur Osborne (1847–1910), Schoolmaster, and his wife Sarah Elizabeth née Biggs,(1843-1907). He grew up in Frome and moved to Streatham, London with his elder brother Harold in the early 1900s. 
educated at the Merchant Venturers' Technical College, Bristol
1901 to 1906, he studied etching and engraving under Frank Short at the Royal College of Art, in South Kensington, London.
1904 published his first etching
World War I served in Artists' Rifles and 60th Division in France, Salonika and Palestine
11 June 1918, he was elected Associate Engraver of Royal Academy.
1924 succeeded Short as the Head of the etching and engraving school when Short retired.
13 Apr 1926  elected  full member of the Royal Academy
1927 Kensington, London married Amy Margaret Stableford (1884–1964).
1938-1962 held the position of President Royal Society of Painter-Etchers and Engravers (now the Royal Society of Painter-Printmakers)
1948 awarded Commander of the Order of the British Empire (CBE)
1 January 1956 elected Senior member of the Royal Academy
22 September 1963 died Kensington, London, England

Bibliography
Print Collector's Quarterly, XII, 1925, pp. 285–313. Entries: 86
Malcolm Charles Salaman (introduction) (1929) The Etchings of Malcolm Osborne, R.A., R.E., incl. 12 leaves of plates (Modern Masters of Etching, no. 21) London: The Studio Ltd.; New York: William Edwin Rudge

Memberships and awards
Commander of the Order of the British Empire (CBE)
Member of the Royal Academy (R.A.)
President of the Royal Society of Painter-Printmakers (P.R.E.)

Students
Edward Bouverie Hoyton was born at Lewisham in south London in 1900. He studied etching under Malcolm Osborne and Stanley Anderson at Goldsmiths' College, New Cross, south London.
Geoffrey Wedgwood
James Henry Govier
James T.A. Osborne

References

External links 
www.artistarchive.com Catalogue listing of over 100 prints by Osborne including the Salaman listing, with a description of most and some images..
 Profile on Royal Academy of Arts Collections

1880 births
1963 deaths
English artists
Artists' Rifles soldiers
Royal Academicians
Alumni of the Royal College of Art
Commanders of the Order of the British Empire
English printmakers